Aztlán Station is a station on Line 1 of the Monterrey Metro. This station is located on Aztlán Avenue in Monterrey. This station is located in the Colon Avenue in the northeast side of the Monterrey Centre. It was opened on 25 April 1991 as part of the inaugural section of Line 1, between San Bernabé and Exposición.

This station serves the heavy populated Aztlán, Nueva Galicia and Valle del Topo Chico neighborhoods, there's an IMSS hospital, a supermarket, and several stores near the station.  It is accessible for people with disabilities.

This station is named after Aztlán Avenue, and its logo represents an Aztec pyramid since Aztlán is a legendary aztec city.

References

Metrorrey stations